Bintang (means Star in English) is the 24-hour Malay language channel which broadcasts Indonesian programmes. This channel was formerly called Astro Aruna, which previously available on the Astro satellite television service. This channel is only available on Astro in the Indo Pek package. Most of the programmes are available in Malay subtitles.

The channel is a collaboration between Astro and Broadway Media from Indonesia, and as such, Broadway’s programs comprises for 80% of the channel's contents.

Indo Pek
On 11 July 2011, Astro launched a new package named Indo Pek (means "Indo Pack" in English), which contains 2 new Astro channels named Bintang (Channel 141 on Astro) and Pelangi (Channel 142 on Astro).

The TV channel has the best variety and lifestyle of Indonesia, such as reality shows, football league, music videos, celebrity gossip, and many more.

Previously the Bintang channel focus more Indonesia drama and movie that move from Pelangi. After 9 years of broadcasting, Bintang and Pelangi has ended all operations on 1 June 2020 at 12:00 am, ceased transmission message shows "Please note. Bintang and Pelangi Channels have been terminated and are no longer on the list. Indopek customers can continue to enjoy brand new content in high definition through Astro Rania HD (112) and Astro Aura HD (113) channels starting 23 May 2020." for english translate, for malay message, please go to Wikipedia Malay Language version and replaced by Astro Rania HD on Channel 112 starting 23 May 2020.

See also
 Pelangi
 Astro (satellite television)

References

Astro Malaysia Holdings television channels
Television channels and stations established in 2011
Television channels and stations disestablished in 2020